The 1953 National Invitation Tournament was the 1953 edition of the annual NCAA college basketball competition.

Selected teams
Below is a list of the 12 teams selected for the tournament.

 BYU
 Duquesne
 Georgetown
 La Salle
 Louisville
 Manhattan
 Niagara
 St. John's
 Saint Louis
 Seton Hall
 Tulsa
 Western Kentucky

Bracket
Below is the tournament bracket.

See also
 1953 NCAA basketball tournament
 1953 NAIA Basketball Tournament

References

National Invitation
National Invitation Tournament
1950s in Manhattan
Basketball in New York City
College sports in New York City
Madison Square Garden
National Invitation Tournament
National Invitation Tournament
Sports competitions in New York City
Sports in Manhattan